The Best Southwest is a term commonly applied to four Dallas suburbs – Cedar Hill, DeSoto, Duncanville, and Lancaster – in southwestern Dallas County, Texas, United States. As of the 2010 census, the four suburbs had a combined population of 168,960.

The term "Best Southwest" was first used when the Cedar Hill, DeSoto, Duncanville, and Lancaster chambers of commerce formed a partnership to improve cooperation between the cities. They formed the Best Southwest Chamber Partnership in 1986, and it was incorporated in 1990.

The four municipalities, which are similar in population and form one of the most demographically diverse regions in the Dallas–Fort Worth metroplex, frequently work together on local events and projects.

Major highways
 Interstate 20
 Interstate 35E
 U.S. Highway 67
Belt Line Road (FM 1382)

Demographics
Best Southwest area demographics based on 2000 census data:

Racial makeup

Economic characteristics

Population growth history

Education

Colleges and universities
Northwood University (Cedar Hill)
Cedar Valley College (Lancaster) - part of the Dallas College system

Public schools
Four school districts serve most of the Best Southwest area:
Cedar Hill Independent School District  (2005-2006 enrollment: 7,972)
Cedar Hill ISD serves most of Cedar Hill as well as small portions of Grand Prairie and Ovilla. The district has 14 campuses (two high schools, a ninth-grade center, two middle schools, three intermediate schools, and six elementary schools).
DeSoto Independent School District  (2005-2006 enrollment: 8,409)
DeSoto ISD covers most of DeSoto, the Dallas County portion of Glenn Heights, and a small portion of Ovilla. The district has 12 campuses (one high school, a freshman Ccampus, three middle schools, and seven elementary schools - four in DeSoto and one in Glenn Heights).
Duncanville Independent School District  (2005-2006 enrollment: 12,327)
The largest of the Best Southwest school districts, Duncanville ISD serves Duncanville, part of northwestern DeSoto, and a significant portion of southwest Dallas. The district has 16 campuses (one high school, three middle Sschools, three intermediate schools, and nine elementary schools - six in Duncanville and three in Dallas).
Lancaster Independent School District  (2005-2006 enrollment: 5,822)
A fast-growing district, Lancaster ISD covers most of Lancaster and a very small portion of Hutchins. The district has nine campuses (one high school, one middle Sschool, and seven elementary schools).

Other school districts that serve parts of the Best Southwest area include the Dallas Independent School District  (small portions of Lancaster and DeSoto) and the Midlothian Independent School District , which serves the small Ellis County portion of Cedar Hill.

See also

Cedar Hill State Park
Joe Pool Lake
Lancaster Airport
Hillside Village

References

External links
Best Southwest
Best Southwest Online
Focus Daily News
Today Newspapers  - serving the Best Southwest and Grand Prairie (ceased publication in July 2009).

Cedar Hill
City of Cedar Hill
Cedar Hill Chamber of Commerce
Cedar Hill Economic Development Corporation

DeSoto
City of DeSoto
DeSoto Chamber of Commerce
DeSoto Economic Development Corporation

Duncanville
City of Duncanville
Duncanville Chamber of Commerce

Lancaster
City of Lancaster
Lancaster Chamber of Commerce
Lancaster Economic Development Corporation

Dallas–Fort Worth metroplex
Geography of Dallas County, Texas